Terry Gibbs Plays Jewish Melodies in Jazztime is a 1963 studio album by Terry Gibbs.

It is the debut recording of Alice Coltrane, credited as Alice Hagood.

Track listing
 "Bei Mir Bist du Schön" (Sammy Cahn, Saul Chaplin, Jacob Jacobs, Sholom Secunda) – 5:01
 "Papirossen (Cigarettes)" (Herman Yablokoff) – 4:24
 "Kazochok (Russian Dance)" (Traditional) – 2:50
 "Vuloch (A Folk Dance)" (Traditional) – 3:59
 "My Yiddish Momme" (Lew Pollack, Jack Yellen) – 3:04
 "And the Angels Sing" (Ziggy Elman, Johnny Mercer) – 2:44
 "S & S" (Terry Gibbs) – 4:34
 "Shaine une Zees (Pretty & Sweet)" (Gibbs) – 6:26
 "Nyah Shere (New Dance)" (Traditional) – 4:11
Recorded 1963 at A&R Recording, New York City: tracks 2, 5, 6, and 8 on January 11 or 12; tracks 1, 3, 4, 7, and 9 on January 12 or March 11.

Personnel
Terry Gibbs - marimba, vibraphone
Alice McLeod - piano
Herman Wright - double bass
Al Logan - piano
Ray Musiker - clarinet
Sol Gage - drums
Sam Kutcher - trombone

References

External links
 Terry Gibbs: The Verve Music Group

1963 albums
Terry Gibbs albums
Mercury Records albums
Jewish music albums